William Joseph Major (12 April 1896 – 24 February 1966) was a Liberal party member of the House of Commons of Canada. He was born in North Lancaster, Ontario.

Major attended International Business College in Montreal, then became a poultry farmer. He was an Ontario municipal politician for Lancaster Township as a councillor from 1931 to 1934, then deputy reeve from 1935 to 1938, then reeve from 1939 to 1946.

He was first elected to Parliament at the Glengarry riding in the 1949 general election. After serving his only term in the House of Commons, Major campaigned as an Independent Liberal and was defeated by Raymond Bruneau of the Liberal party in the 1953 election, when his riding became Glengarry—Prescott.

References

External links
 

1896 births
1966 deaths
Liberal Party of Canada MPs
Members of the House of Commons of Canada from Ontario
Ontario municipal councillors
Place of death missing